Mirabel is a female name stemming from the Latin word mirabilis, meaning "wondrous" or "of wondrous beauty". It was used as both a male and female name in the Middle Ages, but is now almost exclusively female.

Variations 
Mirabelle
Mirabell
Mirabella
Mirabela
Mira
Myrabel
Beli

People 
 Mirabel Osler (1925-2016), English writer and garden designer
 Mirabelle Thovex (born 1991), French snowboarder

Fictional characters 
 Mirabell, male protagonist in William Congreve's 1700 play The Way of the World
 Mirabelle Buttersfield, role played by Claire Danes in Shopgirl
 Mirabel Cotton, a character in Lucy Maud Montgomery's 1909 novel Anne of Avonlea
 Mirabelle Haywood character from Japanese anime television series Ojamajo Doremi
 Mama Mirabelle from Mama Mirabelle's Home Movies cartoon
 Mirabella, a pirate NPC of renowned beauty and potential wife from the video game King's Bounty: The Legend.
 Mirabel, the final and immortal incarnation of Fate from Erin Morgenstern's 2019 novel "The Starless Sea"
 Mirabel Madrigal, the main protagonist in the 2021 animated Disney film Encanto

See also 
 Maribel (disambiguation)
 Mirabella (disambiguation)
 Mirabello (disambiguation)

References

Feminine given names